Events in the year 1629 in Norway.

Incumbents
Monarch: Christian IV

Events
Christoffer Urne became Steward of Norway, serving until 1642.

Arts and literature

Births

16 February – Gert Miltzow, priest and historical writer (died in 1688).
26 February – Iver Leganger, priest and writer (died 1702).
8 May – Niels Juel, admiral (died 1697).

Deaths

See also

References